The Wright Brothers Band, formerly known as the Wright Brothers Overland Stage Company, formed in 1972, is an Indiana-based music group.  They perform songs from the 1920s to the present day, and can cover bluegrass, pop standards, country, gospel, and even Aerosmith rock standards.  The band briefly gained national attention with their patriotic song "Made in the U.S.A.", which celebrated companies that continued to manufacture their products in the United States. They performed on the Grand Ole Opry, The Today Show and appeared 12 times on Nashville Now. Signed with Warner Bros. and Mercury Records in the 1980s, the Wright Brothers had nine singles reach Billboards Hot Country Singles chart. The band also recorded Shot Down in Hot Blood and a cover of "Jim Dandy" for the soundtrack of the 1987 Goldie Hawn movie Overboard, in which they also made a live appearance.

The band's first three albums, Cornfield Cowboys, Memorabilia Box, and Third Phonograph Album, were collected into a box set called Anthology, first on vinyl and then on CD. Memorabilia Box featured live medleys of Harry Nillson's "The Rainmaker" with their own "Dawson", Mickey Newbury's "An American Trilogy" (Battle Hymn of the Republic/Dixie/All My Trials), and Neil Diamond's "Solaimon/Brother Love".

Discography

Albums

Singles

References

American country music groups
Musical groups from Indiana